The following are the Pulitzer Prizes for 1982.

Journalism awards
Public Service:
The Detroit News, for exposing a cover-up in the U.S. Navy, which led to reforms in the Navy.
Local General or Spot News Reporting:
Staff of  The Kansas City Star  and The Kansas City Times, for coverage of the disaster at the Hyatt Regency Hotel.
Local Investigative Specialized Reporting:
Paul Henderson of  The Seattle Times  for proving a man's innocence in a rape investigation.
National Reporting:
Rick Atkinson of  The Kansas City Times, for maintaining a high quality of reporting on issues of national interest.
International Reporting:
John Darnton of The New York Times, for his reporting from Poland.
Feature Writing:
Saul Pett of the Associated Press, for an article on federal bureaucracy
Commentary:
Art Buchwald of Los Angeles Times Syndicate, for his outstanding commentary.
Criticism:
Martin Bernheimer of the Los Angeles Times, for his classical music criticism.
Editorial Writing:
 Jack Rosenthal of The New York Times
Editorial Cartooning:
Ben Sargent of the Austin American-Statesman
Spot News Photography:
Ron Edmonds of the Associated Press, for his photographs covering the assassination attempt of  Ronald Reagan.
Feature Photography:
John H. White of the Chicago Sun-Times, for his consistently excellent photographs.

Letters, Drama and Music Awards
 Fiction:
 Rabbit Is Rich by John Updike (Knopf)
 Drama:
  A Soldier's Play, by Charles Fuller (Hill and Wang)
 History:
 Mary Chesnut's Civil War, edited by C. Vann Woodward (Yale U. Press)
 Biography or Autobiography:
 Grant: A Biography by William McFeely (Norton)
 Poetry:
 The Collected Poems by Sylvia Plath (a posthumous publication) (Harper & Row)
 General Non-Fiction:
 The Soul of a New Machine by Tracy Kidder (Atlantic-Little )
 Music:
 Concerto for Orchestra, by Roger Sessions (E. B. Marks Music)

External links
 

Pulitzer Prizes by year
Pulitzer Prize
Pulitzer Prize